Odd-Magnus Williamson (born 14 September 1980) is a Norwegian copywriter, comedian, and actor. He is known to Norwegian television audiences for his recurring appearance in commercials for the grocery chain ICA and his performance on The Man Show.

Biography
Williamson grew up at Nordstrand in Oslo. In 2006, he landed his first role in a movie, when he joined the cast of the Norwegian film Reprise, where he played Morten.
In 2012, Williamson portrayed the Norwegian painter and sailor Erik Hesselberg, one of the members of Thor Heyerdahl's Kon-Tiki expedition, in a film of the same name.

In 2016, Williamson joined the main cast of the television drama series Aber Bergen where he plays defense attorney Erik Aber. He has also been a writer on the show. The same year, he began appearing in the miniseries Nobel, where he plays the soldier Hans Ivar Johansen.

As of 2019, Williamson appears on the HBO show Beforeigners, where he plays the corrupt police officer Jeppe. Since January 2020, he has acted in the Netflix series Ragnarok.

Williamson married Tinashe Bakas Roll in 2015, and they have one child together, a girl named Ziggy.

Selected filmography

References

External links
 

1980 births
Living people
Norwegian copywriters
Norwegian male film actors
Norwegian male comedians
Norwegian stand-up comedians